Natalie "Nat" Grider (born 10 October 2000) is an Australian rules footballer playing for Brisbane in the AFL Women's competition (AFLW).

Junior and state football
Grider started playing Australian rules football as a teenager with Jindalee Jags. She was also a member of the Brisbane Lions Academy and excelled for the club in the 2018 Winter Series against Greater Western Sydney and Gold Coast. After three years at Jindalee Jags, in 2017, Grider joined the University of Queensland in the AFL Queensland Women's League (QWAFL). In the 2018 season she won the QWAFL Rising Star Award, was selected in the QWAFL Team of the Year, and shared the club's best and fairest award with Megan Hunt and Jane Childes. In 2019, she was selected again for the QWAFL Team of the Year. Grider represented Queensland in the AFL Women's Under 18 Championships. In the 2018 AFL Women's Under 18 Championships she led the team as captain, was selected for the All-Australian team, and was selected as Queensland's most valuable player.

AFLW career
Grider was drafted to the AFL Women's (AFLW) by Brisbane with the 22nd pick in the 2018 AFL Women's draft, joining her long-time teammate Gabby Collingwood. She made her AFLW debut in the Lions' round 4 game against Western Bulldogs at Whitten Oval on 23 February 2019 as a late replacement for captain Leah Kaslar. She played two games in her debut season. In April 2019, Grider re-committed to Brisbane for the 2020 season. She played every game of the season, shutting down small forwards and steadily disposing the ball out of the back-line. She raised her game every week and culminated the season with the club nominating her for the 2020 AFLW Players' Association's Most Valuable Player Award along with Emily Bates and Kate Lutkins. The 2021 AFL Women's season saw Grider rapidly improve, besting her averages in disposals, kicks, handballs, marks and tackles. She received a 2021 AFL Women's Rising Star nomination in the third round of the season after an impressive game against  where she collected 16 disposals, 7 marks and 2 tackles. The first three rounds of the season saw her become the Lions' leading disposal getter.

Statistics
''Statistics correct to the end of round 3, 2021.

|- style=background:#EAEAEA
| scope=row | 2019 ||  || 17
| 2 || 0 || 0 || 5 || 5 || 10 || 3 || 4 || 0.0 || 0.0 || 2.5 || 2.5 || 5.0 || 1.5 || 2.0 || 0
|-
| scope=row | 2020 ||  || 10
| 7 || 0 || 0 || 29 || 28 || 57 || 7 || 20 || 0.0 || 0.0 || 4.1 || 4.0 || 8.1 || 1.0 || 2.9 || 0
|- style=background:#EAEAEA
| scope=row | 2021 ||  || 10
| 3 || 0 || 0 || 27 || 25 || 52 || 7 || 16 || 0.0 || 0.0 || 9.0 || 8.3 || 17.3 || 2.3 || 5.3 || 
|- class=sortbottom
! colspan=3 | Career
! 12 !! 0 !! 0 !! 61 !! 58 !! 119 !! 17 !! 40 !! 0.0 !! 0.0 !! 5.1 !! 4.8 !! 9.9 !! 1.4 !! 3.3 !! 0
|}

Playing style
Grider can play as a half-back or as a midfielder and demonstrates athleticism and strong marking skills.

Personal life
Grider was born and raised in Brisbane. She is a supporter of Brisbane Lions, despite her mum supporting St Kilda and her dad supporting Carlton. She studied at the University of Queensland and received a Bachelor of Exercise and Sports Science.

References

External links
 

2000 births
Living people
Sportswomen from Queensland
Australian rules footballers from Queensland
Brisbane Lions (AFLW) players
21st-century Australian women